Inside Out is a 1975 British action thriller film, produced and directed by Peter Duffell, and starring James Mason, Robert Culp, and Telly Savalas. The film, shot in West Berlin and the Netherlands, aired on television in the United States on NBC on 1 January 1978 under the alternate title Hitler's Gold. It was also titled The Golden Heist, and Ein genialer Bluff (in West Germany). It was an inspiration for the film Wild Geese II.

Plot

In 1975, Harry Morgan (Telly Savalas) and Sylvester "Sly" Wells (Robert Culp) come up with a plan to recover six million dollars of Nazi gold, lost since the end of World War II. The story begins during the Third Reich. A crew of Wehrmacht soldiers is driving a cargo truck through the Black Forest when they are stopped by a road block of SS commandos. The SS hijack the truck and its cargo killing its passengers. Thirty-four years later, Harry Morgan is driving his Rolls-Royce home in London, where a repossession agent is waiting to confiscate the car. Harry gives the agent the keys, as Harry boasts that he will soon own another one. He enters his family's apartment, where he has a brief conversation with his wife, Meredith (Lorna Dallas), about their debts and the building that is soon to be sold. As he looks through the bills, he finds a letter addressed to him from someone in his past, requesting to meet with him.

The following day, Harry meets Ernst Furben (James Mason) at the London Embassy Hotel. Ernst invites Harry to his hotel room, where they reminisce about the past, and Ernst brings up the story about the cargo. According to his story, he received an order for two guards, a heavy truck and a driver. The truck was assigned to collect a cargo from a railroad yard and deliver it to the Reich Bank. The driver named Hans Schmidt (Günter Meisner) presented the order to the railroad official in charge to receive the cargo that was intercepted by a convoy of SS officers. They presented Schmidt with an order signed by a Nazi Party official to transport the cargo from the Balkans. Schmidt noticed the contents of gold bars when one of the crates was dropped. Schmidt was shipped out to the Eastern Front, where he was captured, and remained in prison until the year 1955. Twenty years later, Schmidt met Ernst again, and told him the story about the gold bars. During the war, an order could be countermanded by Adolf Hitler, Heinrich Himmler, Hermann Göring, Martin Bormann, Rudolf Hess, or Reinhardt Holtz. Schmidt confirmed that Reinhardt Holtz (Wolfgang Lukschy) was the Nazi party official who signed the transfer order. Ernst proposes that he and Harry join forces to release Holtz, to find out the location of the gold. After some discussion about a fellow inmate of the concentration camp, named Sergeant Prior, they discuss tentative ideas for releasing Holtz.

A few days later, Harry travels to Amsterdam to find Sly playing chess with a Dutch teenage boy in a pub. Sly forfeits the game, and speaks to Harry, who tells him about the gold worth six million dollars. Sly initially refuses, but hears Harry out and agrees to the heist. Harry talks Sly into paying for two tickets to West Berlin, where they meet Ernst. They drive by Seigfried prison (where Holtz is an inmate) on the way to an expensive Berlin hotel, where Harry is ringing up an expensive tab for Ernst to pay. Harry goes to the store of Peter Dohlberg (Charles Korvin) to ask him to finance the heist. Peter agrees to the heist for 15% of it. Harry reluctantly agrees, knowing he has no other options. Peter's employee, named Siggi, brings her friend Erika Kurtz (Doris Kunstmann) to meet Harry. They arrange to have Udo Blimperman (Peter Schlesinger), an obese costume shop owner, give them the uniforms they need, in exchange for unlimited meals. Later that evening, Udo gets drunk and crashes through a table.

Harry introduces Sly to Erika and Udo. Erika confirms that Udo will recover. The next morning, Harry wakes up to find that Sly and Erika had been playing chess all night, and that Udo had ordered another large meal for himself. Harry and Ernst meet Schmidt at a carnival to discuss his part in the heist. Harry meets Prior (Aldo Ray), who is now a prison sergeant at Seigfried prison. Harry mentions the scheme to the rest of the group at a hotel. Prior tells everyone about the security procedures at the prison, where the only man to speak to Holtz is a doctor named Maar (Adrian Hoven). Prior offers to allow them to interrogate Holtz in his cell, but Sly says it will not work, stating that Holtz will not disclose the information to anyone outside the Nazi party. Sly informs Schmidt about his idea to stage a confidence game to trick Holtz, and use Erika as an assistant. When Ernst begins to object, Sly reassures him that his idea will not cost him his share.

Sly has fallen in love with Erika, and they go on a walk together to discuss more details about the heist. They find an abandoned courthouse, which they pick the lock on, and decide to use it for their confidence game on Holtz. They purchase furnishings for the scheme, while Harry and Ernst purchase a used car to repaint as a United States Army staff car. Back at the hotel, Prior sets up a model of the prison to show where Holtz's cell is located. Ernst and Sly purchase a camera to photograph Maar with a transsexual named Pauli (Bernard Bauer). Maar is blackmailed by Schmidt and Ernst, claiming that Pauli was Ernst's nephew. Knowing the police will not believe him, Maar agrees to switch places with Holtz, while Harry and Sly accompany them, disguised as United States Army officers. Holtz is drugged with a sedative, while Sly distracts the cell block guard with a ruse about a filthy cell, and orders him to clean it up. Prior relocks the door with the key that has been inadvertently left in the cell door and returns it to the guard, while Harry and Sly leave with Holtz, who is barely conscious enough to walk escorted. Harry makes up a cover story that Holtz needs to be seen by a dental surgeon the next day for an infection. Prior collaborates to ensure that no one else will see Holtz to ensure that no one else knows the surgeons identity, who is actually Ernst. Harry rebukes Prior for not having his name on the visitor's log as part of a ruse.

They pick up Erika from work to change Holtz's appearance to make him look younger. As they arrive at the derelict courthouse, they change Holtz from Maar's borrowed civilian street clothes into a replica of his old Nazi uniform. Holtz is escorted into a courtroom furnished to look like a Third Reich office. Once inside the sedative wears off, he awakens to find himself in a staged meeting, with Schmidt disguised as Adolf Hitler, Sly disguised as an SS officer, and Ernst disguised as a Field Marshal. Schmidt states that Holtz stole the gold from the Reich and betrayed him. Holtz is confused about what Schmidt is referring to and asks what gold was stolen. Schmidt tells Holtz that the gold disappeared only seven days ago, and confirms that Holtz signed the order to have it deposited into the Reich Bank. Ernst escorts Holtz into another room to refresh his memory. Sly and Schmidt congratulate each other on their performances, while Ernst tells Holtz that Germany is winning the war and Holtz has been hospitalised. Holtz remembers that the gold was hidden to prevent Hermann Göring from stealing it. He will only tell Hitler the exact location, though. Holtz whispers to Schmidt (still disguised as Hitler) that the gold is hidden in his bunker, which is on the property of his summer home in Vanglitz. Holtz is given another sedative, while Schmidt admires a portrait of Hitler, comparing his likeness to it. Sly congratulates Schmidt, and Harry sarcastically says that they should do a double act with himself as Benito Mussolini. Schmidt gets carried away with his acting, while Ernst is worried Holtz may recognize the scam, and that their cover can still be blown by him reporting the incident to the prison guards. Sly proposes to return Holtz first thing in the morning before going after the gold, but Harry refuses to wait, worried that it could be found by anyone at any time.

They cross the border into East Germany and everything goes well, despite Schmidt becoming nervous. They arrive at the summer home, to find that the bomb shelter has been built over by an apartment building. Further examination of one of the basement rooms reveals that the bunker is directly below, separated by three feet of concrete. Ernst contacts Wilhelm Schlager (Richard Warner) to arrange to get cooperation from the Soviet police garrison. Schlager insists on 1/8% of the heist for his inconvenience. He steps into another room and conceals a Walther PPK in his belt, while he calls Colonel Kosnikov (Constantine Gregory) of the Russian army. He plans for them to double cross the group, to get a two-way split for himself and Kosnokov. Kosnikov arrives with the Russian army, surrounds the house, and kills Schlager. Sly notices and secretly retrieves Schlager's handgun. Kosnikov demands a share for allowing them to stage a bomb threat to get access to the bunker. He reroutes his troops to the apartment building, and provides the group with equipment to impersonate a bomb disposal unit.

The army evacuates the residents, so that they can begin drilling through the concrete floor. A boy wanders into the room where the dynamite is placed for the explosion. The boy is discovered at the last moment and safely removed before the explosion. Ernst announces that another bomb has been discovered, as a diversion to allow them to enter the hole leading to the bunker. Searching the bunker, the group finds two steel chests containing the gold behind a partition. Sly breaks the locks with a hammer and a chisel as the group admires their loot. After the gold is retrieved, Kosnikov shows up alone to intercept the group, armed with a machine gun. He tries to blackmail them and take all of the gold. As Schmidt pleads for their lives, Harry pins Kosnikov with a ladder. Kosnikov then shoots and kills Schmidt, after which Sly kills Kosnikov with Schlager's pistol. When the team returns to West Germany, they are confronted by the checkpoint guard about their flags on the wrong sides of the car's hood. The checkpoint guard puts the flags on correctly and allows them to leave. They throw Schmidt's body into a river.

They pick up Erika, as well as Holtz, who is still sedated. They turn the gold over to Peter to have it divided up and converted from bullion to United States dollars. En route to the prison, they are forced to deal with a truck with toppled pallets blocking the road. They use the pallets to create a ramp to jump over the cargo truck and proceed to the prison. Returning to the prison, they are confronted by the United States Army colonel (Don Fellows) in charge of Seigfried, who demands an explanation about the unauthorized personnel at the prison. Harry cons their way out of the situation to allow Ernst access as the dental surgeon. Maar and Holtz are switched back to their proper places. Holtz wakes up in his cell to tell the guard that he believes he saw Hitler. As they leave the prison, Harry asks Ernst if he ever was really a Nazi. Ernst replies "Not necessarily." After they abandon the staff car, Harry, Ernst and Sly walk away on the streets of Berlin.

Cast 

Telly Savalas – Harry Morgan
Robert Culp – Sylvester (Sly) Wells
James Mason – Ernst Furben
Günter Meisner – Hans Schmidt
Aldo Ray – Master Sergeant Prior
Adrian Hoven – Dr. Maar
Wolfgang Lukschy – Reinhardt Holtz
Charles Korvin – Peter Dohlberg
Constantine Gregory – Colonel Kosnikov
Richard Warner – Wilhelm Schlager
Don Fellows – U.S. Army Colonel
Doris Kunstmann – Erika Kurtz
Lorna Dallas – Meredith Morgan
Sigrid Hanack – Siggi
Peter Schlesinger – Udo Blimpermann
Stephen Curtis – Chess Boy
Timothy Peters – Salesman

Novelization
In advance of the film's release (as common for the era), a paperback novelization of the screenplay was released. The author was co-screenwriter Judd Bernard, and the affiliated publishers were Award Books (US) and Sphere Books (UK).

See also
 Kelly's Heroes (1970)
 Escape to Athena (1979)
 Wild Geese II (1985)

References 

 Leonard Maltin's 2010 Movie Guide 
 Time Out Film Guide, Edited by John Pym

External links 
 
 All Movie
 Inside Out

1975 films
1970s action thriller films
West German films
English-language German films
British heist films
Warner Bros. films
Transgender-related films
1975 LGBT-related films
Films set in 1975
Films set in West Germany
Films set in East Germany
Films set in Berlin
Films set in Amsterdam
Films set in London
Films shot in Berlin
Films about Nazi Germany
1970s English-language films
Films directed by Peter Duffell
1970s British films
Films set in the Black Forest
British World War II films